Tomayquichua District is one of eight districts of the province Ambo in Peru. Despite its size and population, it is actually a place that receives a bit of tourism (almost entirely domestic) due to locally popular events that are hosted there such as “El Baile de Negritos”, or the domestically famous house of “La  Perricholi”.

See also 
 Awkimarka

References